Sky Crime is a British pay television channel owned and operated by Sky, a division of Comcast. The channel launched on 1 October 2019, replacing Real Lives. Sky Crime broadcasts crime dramas from Oxygen, HBO, Jupiter Entertainment and Woodcut Media.



Broadcasting

Satellite
Sky UK:
 Channel 122 (HD)
 Channel 222 (+1)
 Channel 820 (SD)

Cable
Virgin Media:
 Channel 136 (SD)
 Channel 137 (HD)
 Channel 221 (+1)

Programming
Sky Crime broadcasts:
Murder in the Valleys
How I Caught The Killer
Murders That Shocked the Nation
Snapped
I Love You, Now Die
The Disappearance of Susan Cox Powell
In Defense Of
A Wedding and a Murder
Kemper on Kemper
Britain’s Most Evil Killers
Road Wars
Brit Cops
Stop Search Seize
Border Security: Canada's Front Line
Nothing to Declare (Season 9 only)
Atlanta’s Missing & Murdered: The Lost Children
The Real Manhunter
Motorway Patrol
Highway PatrolCaught on Dashcam''

See also
 List of television stations in the United Kingdom
 Sky Krimi, a longer running crime-themed German television channel equivalent also operated by Sky plc as a part of its Germany and Austria portfolio.

References

External links
Sky Crime at sky.com

Sky television channels
Crime television networks
Television channels and stations established in 2019
English-language television stations in the United Kingdom
Television channels in the United Kingdom
2019 establishments in the United Kingdom